Anand Gandhi (born Anand Modi, 26 September 1980) is an Indian filmmaker, entrepreneur, media producer, innovator and systems researcher. He is also the founder/CEO of the Mumbai-based new media studio and systems think tank Memesys Culture Lab. His debut feature film Ship of Theseus (2013), which premiered at the Toronto International Film Festival won the National Film Award for Best Picture. Gandhi's film as creative director, executive producer and co-writer, Tumbbad opened the Critics' Week at the 75th Venice Film Festival, released to a wide critical acclaim in October 2018.

In 2017, he produced An Insignificant Man – a nonfiction thriller directed by Khushboo Ranka and Vinay Shukla on the rise of the Aam Aadmi Party in India. It was released to widespread international and domestic acclaim. The film was picked up by Vice for International distribution.

Actor and producer Ajay Devgn bought rights to Gandhi's play Beta Kaagdo. It has been made into the feature film Helicopter Eela, starring Bollywood actress Kajol. Gandhi is also the co-creator of ElseVR, India's first virtual reality (VR) platform aiming to bring "extraordinary and urgent stories" to the digital mainstream.

Gandhi delivered his INK Talk at the annual INK conference in 2013 where he enumerated his motivations behind making films while expounding on the role of memes in choice-creation. He was a mentor at the Xprize Visioneers 2016 Summit, an annual gathering of the Xprize enterprise, a leading global non-profit dedicated to encouraging "radical breakthroughs for the benefit of humanity" through incentivized prize competitions.

While on the steering committee of the 48th International Film Festival of India (IFFI), Gandhi served as the creative director of the new VR chapter of the festival.

Anand Gandhi unveiled a poster of his next project, Emergence, on the seventh anniversary of his film Ship of Theseus on Sunday. Emergence, which is set in a post-pandemic world, is "the story of bit by bit building of resilience through human ingenuity as scientists and everyday heroes create solutions,” says Gandhi.

Early life 
Anand dropped out of college at the age of 18. Anand was fascinated by the idea of using neuroscience and evolutionary biology to answer deep and persistent questions of philosophy. He has cited Richard Dawkins and Douglas Adams as early influences.

In 1996, Anand pursued a program in graphic design and started a studio called Ciceros Graphics. He also taught Adobe Photoshop and other digital tools, new at the time, to traditional graphic designers. At 16, Anand assisted activist and polemist Abhay Mehta with the maintenance of a whistleblowing website.

Television, theatre and short films 
Anand Gandhi's writing career began in 2000 when he wrote dialogue for the first eighty-two episodes of popular daily soap opera Kyunki Saas Bhi Kabhi Bahu Thi and screenplay for Kahaani Ghar Ghar Kii, both of which became the longest running shows on Indian Television. The same year, Anand's play Sugandhi was awarded the prestigious National Prize. Most of his plays, including Sugandhi, Pratyancha, Kshanotsav, Na, and Janashtaru were written for the alternative one-act theatre. Anand has penned one mainstream Gujarati play Chal Reverse Ma Jaiye and produced Grey Elephants In Denmark (2009), a Hindi/English play written and directed by Chaitanya Tamhane.

He made his film directorial debut with Right Here, Right Now (2003), a critically acclaimed 30-minute short film that dealt with the idea of cyclic causality and was shot in two continuous takes. The film premiered in competition at the Tribeca Film Festival. His second film Continuum (2006), which he co-wrote and co-directed with Khushboo Ranka, was a montage of simple stories from everyday life, popular culture and folklore that explore "the continuum of life and death, of love and paranoia, of trade and value, of need and invention, of hunger and enlightenment".

Anand has also directed numerous brand films. His film, based on the work of Dr Dnyaneshwar Bhosale, 'Vicks: Care Lives On #TouchOfCare' won 4 awards at Spikes Asia Award 2022 - a Silver in Direction and a Bronze in Casting, Script and Cinematography - most by an Indian film in the Film Craft category. His previous film for Vicks, titled 'One In a Million', won 4 Cannes Lions in 2019, including a Silver Lion and 3 Bronze Lions for Creative Strategy, Film Craft, and Film Healthcare. The film also won three Silvers at Spikes Asia for Direction, Script, and Casting in the Filmcraft category. Anand's Lifebuoy ‘Help a child reach 5’ campaign won a Bronze Cannes Lion in 2017 for Creative Effectiveness, along with the “Grand Prix” in PR, and “Silver” in Healthcare at Spikes Asia 2016. His film for Gillette "Soldiers can cry" won a shortlist at Cannes 2020. Anand is on the jury of the One Show 2022.

Ship of Theseus 
Anand's first feature-length film Ship of Theseus premiered at the 2012 Toronto International Film Festival, where it was discovered as the "hidden gem" of the festival's selection of films that year. It won the Best Film Award at the Transylvania International Film Festival, Best Cinematography Award at the Tokyo International Film Festival, the Jury Prize for Technical Excellence at the Mumbai Film Festival, Best Actress Award at the Dubai International Film Festival. It was given a Special Mention by the Sutherland Jury "for tickling our intellect and showing us rarely-seen facets of Indian life". Film Critic Derek Malcolm put it on the list of "films that changed our lives", made to celebrate the centenary of The Critics' Circle.

The title of the film alludes to Theseus' paradox, most notably recorded in Life of Theseus, wherein the Greek historian and philosopher Plutarch inquires whether a ship that has been restored by replacing all its parts remains the same ship.

The film was released in India on 19 July 2013. It became the most successful international arthouse film at the Indian box office. In 2014, it won the award for the Best Feature Film of the year at the 61st National Film Awards.

Post Ship of Theseus, Anand distributed Nishtha Jain's documentary film Gulabi Gang under his then-company Recyclewala Films, making it one of the first theatrical distributions for a documentary film in India. Gulabi Gang was awarded as the Best Film on Social Issues and the Best Non-Feature Film editing at the 61st National Film Awards.

From November 2014 to May 2015, Anand was busy shooting for Tumbad, an unreleased fantasy-epic set in the India of 1940s. He is credited as the co-writer, executive producer and creative director of Tumbad.

Memesys Culture Lab 
Towards the end of 2015, Anand founded Memesys Culture Lab with Zain Memon, Khushboo Ranka, Vinay Shukla, Neil Pagedar and Pooja Shetty.  After some early pioneering work in virtual reality (VR) journalism, the lab launched six VR documentaries on ElseVR, a VR journalism platform. Gandhi and team commissioned documentary filmmakers to capture "extraordinary and urgent stories" in VR, accompanied by a piece of long-form journalism.

The VR documentaries available on the ElseVR platform are:
 When Borders Move by Shubhangi Swarup
 Yeh Ballet by Sooni Taraporevala
 Submerged by Nishtha Jain
 Caste is not a Rumour by Naomi Shah and Pourush Turel
 The Cost of Coal by Faiza Ahmad Khan and Aruna Chandrashekhar
 Right to Pray by Khushboo Ranka
The ElseVR team also created two behind-the-scenes documentaries, Dhaakad and Inside Dangal, on the making of Aamir Khan's Dangal. For ElseVR, Memesys partnered with Amnesty International India, Oxfam India and United Nations Virtual Reality (UNVR) and BBC.

On 11 September 2016, Anand's documentary production An Insignificant Man had its world premiere at the Toronto International Film Festival. The film was also screened at the BFI London Film Festival and the Busan International Film Festival.

Directed by Khushboo Ranka and Vinay Shukla, An Insignificant Man was released in theatres in India on 17 November 2017. The film was released in more than 33 screens across India and continued to perform well into its third and fourth weeks. The box office net of 12 million INR makes it the most successful documentary feature out of India. The film, which chronicles the rise of anti-corruption protests in India and the formation and rise to power of the Aam Aadmi Party, received standing ovations in theatres and was picked up by VICE Media.

Gandhi has also completed development on three projects – Ok Computer, New Aesop's Fables and Some of All Pasts. For Ok Computer, a science-fiction comedy created by collaborators Pooja Shetty and Neil Pagedar, Bollywood star Hrithik Roshan has been confirmed in lead. Australian actor Hugo Weaving may be roped in to play one of the parts.

Anand's play Beta Kaagdo, which he adapted into a screenplay along with Mitesh Shah, is being made into a feature film with Kajol in lead. The film is being directed by Pradeep Sarkar and produced by Ajay Devgn.

Anand has called himself an admirer of Kajol's work and said that he loved "talking and discussing ideas with her".

Talks and engagements 
In 2013, Anand was awarded the "Contribution to Jain Philosophy prize" by Mumbai University. Anand was selected for the INK Fellowship which comprised "around 25 young change-makers from across disciplines like art, science, social concerns, sport and technology, who they believe will be game-changers in their respective fields". He delivered his Ink Talk at the INK2013 conference in Kochi where he spoke at length about his motivations as a filmmaker while "gexploring the ideas, metaphors, memes, and the information packaged in those memes that influence our choices profoundly".

Anand was a speaker at the Singularity University (SingularityU) Forum in India, where he shared his ideas on using insights from cognitive science in narrative structures. The summit also featured talks by Peter Diamandis, Rob Nail, Neil Jacobstein, and Stefan Sagmeister, among others.

Gandhi is also the recipient of the Rajeev Circle Fellowship, designed to "identify and empower young entrepreneurs".

Gandhi delivered a talk on the evolutionary function of awe at the launch of the first DAQRI AR helmet.

Gandhi was a mentor at the Xprize Visioneers 2016 Summit to vote on solutions that needed to be incentivised and accelerated by the prize. Early detection of cancer and technological solutions for Amyotrophic Lateral Sclerosis (ALS) were the most voted for projects at the summit, along with  the Avatar Xprize sponsored by Japanese airlines ANA to "create prototypes of avatars that satisfy the goal of transporting people's consciousness".

Gandhi moderated a masterclass at the Global Entrepreneurship Summit 2017 on the future of Virtual Reality (VR) and Augmented Reality (AR).

Gandhi was invited by the I&B Ministry to lead the VR chapter of the 48th International Film Festival of India (IFFI), 2017 held in Goa. He delivered a masterclass on VR as the new medium to "preserve records and memories for posterity".

Filmography

Television

Personal life

He was born into a Vaishnav Gujarati family and spoke Gujarati for the first ten years of his life, and his surname was Modi. Later his mother got remarried and he was adopted and raised by a Gujarati Jain family, changing his surname to Gandhi. He has always identified himself as thoroughly non-religious and atheistic. He lives with his partner Kani Kusruti in Mumbai. He loves Gujarati poetry, including that of Ramesh Parekh, Mareez, and Shekhadam Abuwala. He writes poetry but does not publish it.

References

External links
 

1980 births
Living people
21st-century Indian film directors
Gujarati people
Film directors from Mumbai
Indian male screenwriters
Indian television writers
Film producers from Mumbai
Indian theatre directors
Indian atheists
Former Jains
Screenwriters from Mumbai
Directors who won the Best Feature Film National Film Award
Male television writers